Bourgneuf-en-Mauges is a former commune in the Maine-et-Loire department in western France. On 15 December 2015, it was merged into the new commune Mauges-sur-Loire.

Population

See also
Communes of the Maine-et-Loire department

References

Former communes of Maine-et-Loire